Roman Laes (13 September 1905, in Tallinn – 22 September 1971) was an Estonian politician. He was a member of the fifth legislature of the Estonian Parliament.

Laes died at Mercy Hospital in Chula Vista, California, in 1971.

References

1905 births
1971 deaths
Politicians from Tallinn
People from Kreis Harrien
Left-wing Workers politicians
Members of the Riigikogu, 1932–1934
Estonian World War II refugees
Estonian emigrants to the United States